The 1991 Metro Conference men's basketball tournament was held March 7–9 at the Roanoke Civic Center in Roanoke, Virginia. 

Florida State defeated Louisville in the championship game, 76–69, to win their first Metro men's basketball tournament.

The Seminoles received the conference's automatic bid to the 1991 NCAA Tournament. Additionally, Southern Miss, the regular season conference champions, received an at-large bid.

Format
All eight members of the conference participated. Teams were seeded based on regular season conference records.

Bracket

References

Metro Conference men's basketball tournament
Tournament
Metro Conference men's basketball tournament
Metro Conference men's basketball tournament